Lygniodes morio is a moth of the family Erebidae. It is found in the Philippines (Mindanao, Luzon).

References

Moths described in 1900
Lygniodes
Moths of the Philippines